Urturi is a hamlet and council located in the municipality of Bernedo, in Álava province, Basque Country, Spain. As of 2020, it has a population of 62.

Geography 
Urturi is located 40km southeast of Vitoria-Gasteiz.

References

Populated places in Álava